David Onyemata (born November 13, 1992) is a Nigerian-Canadian professional American football defensive end for the Atlanta Falcons of the National Football League (NFL). He played college football at Manitoba.

Early years
Onyemata is a native of Lagos, Nigeria, where he attended the Chrisland Schools but he graduated from Rainbow College. He immigrated, on his own, to Winnipeg in 2011 to attend college the University of Manitoba.

College career
Onyemata had never seen a gridiron football game until he came to Winnipeg, but he became a standout player for the Manitoba Bisons. He won the 2015 J. P. Metras Trophy as the top down lineman in CIS football, was invited to play in the East–West Shrine Game, and became the top Canadian prospect in the 2016 draft.

Professional career

New Orleans Saints
Onyemata was drafted by the New Orleans Saints in the fourth round of the 2016 NFL draft as the 120th overall pick. He was the first player from the University of Manitoba ever selected for the NFL draft, and the twelfth NFL draft pick from the CIS (now U Sports). The Saints traded their fifth round picks for 2016 and 2017 to Washington in order to draft Onyemata. As of the 2020 NFL Draft, he remains the most recent draft selection from CIS/U Sports. He was also selected by the Saskatchewan Roughriders in the fourth round of the 2016 CFL Draft.

In 2018, Onyemata played in all 16 games with four starts, recording 35 tackles, 4.5 sacks, and a forced fumble.

Onyemata was suspended the first game of the 2019 season for violating the league's substances of abuse policy. He was reinstated to the active roster on September 10, 2019.

On March 18, 2020, Onyemata signed a three-year, $27 million contract extension with the Saints.

In Week 9 against the Tampa Bay Buccaneers on Sunday Night Football, Onyemata recorded his first career interception off a pass thrown by Tom Brady during the 38–3 win. 

On March 3, 2021, Onyemata agreed to convert part of his $7MM base salary into a signing bonus to free up cap space for New Orleans. On July 16, Onyemata was suspended six games by the NFL after testing positive for a banned substance.

Atlanta Falcons
On March 16, 2023, Onyemata signed a three-year, $35 million contract with the Atlanta Falcons, reuniting him with his former Saints position coach, Ryan Nielsen, who was named the Falcons defensive coordinator.

References

External links
 Manitoba Bisons bio

1992 births
Living people
American football defensive tackles
Atlanta Falcons players
Canadian football defensive linemen
Manitoba Bisons football players
New Orleans Saints players
Nigerian players of American football
Nigerian players of Canadian football
Sportspeople from Lagos